Lee Hsin-han and Lu Yen-hsun won the title in men's tennis doubles, beating Andre Begemann and Purav Raja in the final by an walkover.

Seeds

Draw

Draw

References
 Main Draw

Men's Doubles 
Hua Hin Championships - Doubles
 in Thai tennis